Operation Bluecoat was a British offensive in the Battle of Normandy, from 30 July until 7 August 1944, during the Second World War. The geographical objectives of the attack, undertaken by VIII Corps and XXX Corps of the British Second Army (Lieutenant-General Miles Dempsey), were to secure the road junction of Vire and the high ground of Mont Pinçon.

The attack was made at short notice to exploit the success of Operation Cobra by the First US Army after it broke out on the western flank of the Normandy beachhead and to exploit the withdrawal of the 2nd Panzer Division from the Caumont area, to take part in Unternehmen Lüttich (Operation Liège) a German counter-offensive against the Americans.

Background
From 18 to 20 July, the British Second Army conducted Operation Goodwood on the eastern flank of the Allied beachhead south-east of Caen, in a southerly direction, which had forced the Germans to keep the bulk of their armoured units in the east around Caen. After Goodwood, Ultra revealed that the Germans planned to withdraw the 21st Panzer Division into reserve, before moving to the west (American) sector of the front. On 25 July, after a false start the day before, the First US Army began Operation Cobra.

Prelude

Allied offensive preparations

The boundary between the British Second Army (Lieutenant-General Sir Miles Dempsey) and the US First Army was moved, the British taking over from the US V Corps, against which were lightly-armed but well dug in German infantry, which gave an opportunity for a new operation to keep tying down German armour. The VIII Corps headquarters and the 7th, 11th and Guards Armoured divisions were moved westwards toward Caumont on the western flank of XXX Corps. Dempsey planned to attack on 2 August but the speed of events forced him to advance the date.

German defensive preparations
The 326th Division, south and east of Caumont, was up to strength and took over a large number of field defences and camouflaged firing positions, behind extensive minefields in the ideal defensive terrain of the  bocage.

Plan

XXX Corps was to lead the attack with the 43rd (Wessex) Infantry Division to advance to the top of Bois du Homme (Point 361). The left flank was to be protected by the 50th (Northumbrian) Infantry Division with the 7th Armoured Division in reserve. A raid by over  rather than an artillery bombardment was to prepare the way for the attack.

Battle

Visibility was poor but the bombers accurately placed  of bombs. The damage to German equipment was slight, partly because there was little of it in the target areas and because the 43rd and 50th divisions were held just beyond the start line, well north of the target areas in their sector. The advance of the left flank units of the 11th Armoured Division through "Area A" made rapid progress. Many British units were held up by minefields, sunken roads, thick hedges and steep gullies but in the centre the attackers gained . On 31 July, the 11th Armoured Division of VIII Corps exploited a German inter–army boundary weakness, when they discovered an undefended bridge ("Dickie's Bridge")  behind the German front, over the River Souleuvre. Reinforcing the opportunity quickly with Cromwell tanks followed by further support units, they broke up the first German armoured units sent to counter-attack. British forces advanced to about  short of Vire by 2 August, which was on the American side of the army boundary. There was confusion as to who had the rights to use certain roads and the British attack was restricted and diverted south-east.

The British advance was held up by the German reinforcements. VIII Corps also had to protect its eastern flank, because XXX Corps had not kept up the same rate of advance. The commander of XXX Corps, Lieutenant-General Gerard Bucknall, was dismissed on 2 August and the commander of the 7th Armoured Division, Major General George Erskine, was sacked the next day. Lieutenant General Brian Horrocks, a veteran of North Africa replaced Bucknall on 4 August. The Second Army advance was brought to a temporary halt on 4 August. Vire fell to an American night attack by the 116th Regiment of the US 29th Division against the 363rd Division on 6 August. On the same day, the 43rd (Wessex) Division and tanks of the 13th/18th Royal Hussars captured Mont Pinçon.

Aftermath

Analysis
Operation Bluecoat kept German armoured units fixed on the British eastern front and continued the wearing down of the strength of German armoured formations in the area. The breakthrough in the centre of the Allied front surprised the Germans, when they were distracted by the Allied attacks at both ends of the Normandy bridgehead. By the time of the American break-out at Avranches, there was little to no reserve strength left for Operation Luttich, the German counter-offensive, which was defeated by 12 August. The 7th Army had no choice but to retire rapidly east of the Orne river, covered by a rearguard by all the remaining armoured and motorised units to allow time for the surviving infantry to reach the Seine. After the first stage of the withdrawal beyond the Orne, the manoeuvre collapsed for a lack of fuel, Allied air attacks and the constant pressure of the Allied armies, culminating in the encirclement of many German forces in the Falaise pocket.

Casualties

During Bluecoat and later operations in Normandy, VIII Corps suffered

Subsequent operations

Operation Grouse
With news from the American sector by 9 August that  (Operation Liège), the German counter-offensive from Mortain, had been defeated, O'Connor planned a new attack either to pin down the German defenders opposite VIII Corps or precipitate a collapse. A three-phase attack was planned by the Guards Armoured Division and the attached 6th Guards Tank Brigade, to begin on 11 August but the day dawned with a dense mist, which prevented the preliminary bombing and disorganised the tank-infantry attack. In the centre, three Panthers were spotted in a farm yard at Le Haut Perrier and ambushed, two being knocked out and the survivor being set on fire on the southern outskirts of the village by a PIAT gunner. The British advance continued towards Point 242 north of Chênedollé, where a German counter-attack knocked out six Shermans for a loss of two Panthers and a  assault gun. To the west, the 2nd Irish Guards–5th Coldstream tank-infantry group made faster progress and reached the west side of Chênedollé. When the village was attacked it was found that the garrison had withdrawn and as the bombers had failed to arrive, the village was consolidated and further attacks were postponed and then cancelled.

On the right of the Guards Armoured Division, the attack began at  along a road running south through Viessoix and le Broulay,  further on, thence to Moncy,  to the east, protected on the right by the advance of the 3rd Division. From Moncy, the attack was to be continued to Point 260 on Mont de Cerisi  further on. German resistance was as determined as that in the east. To the north of La Personnerie, minefields covered by fire from the 3rd  Division, held up the advance. In the afternoon an attempt to detour to the east through Le Val was also blocked, the advance having covered only  in five hours. With the attack bogged down at Le Val and Viessoix the troops at Le Val were withdrawn during the evening and new orders were received to hold the Vire–Vassy road.

Order of battle

Notable actions
 Night attack by 5th DCLI on Les Plessis Grimoult, south of Mont Pinçon.

See also

 Rhino tank

Notes

Footnotes

References

 Anon, British Army of the Rhine Battlefield Tour: Operation Bluecoat, Germany: BAOR, 1947/Uckfield: Naval and Military Press, 2021, ISBN 978-1-78331-812-4.

Further reading

External links
 British Library map, Caumont
 British Library map, Vire
 Operation Bluecoat
 11th Armoured Division
 Atlas of Bluecoat maps
 Museum dedicated to Operation Bluecoat in Normandy

Conflicts in 1944
1944 in France
Operation Overlord
Bluecoat
Military operations of World War II involving Germany
Bluecoat
Bluecoat
July 1944 events
August 1944 events